Patosi may refer to:

 Patos, Albania, is a city in the District of Fier in Albania
 Ayanda Patosi (born 1992), South African professional footballer